Epaphras was an observer of the Apostle Paul mentioned twice in the New Testament epistle of Colossians and once in the New Testament letter to Philemon.

Biblical accounts
Epaphras is mentioned three times in the New Testament, twice in Colossians and once in Philemon. He was a believer in Christ who served with the apostle Paul, who referred to him as a “fellow servant,” “faithful minister,” and “servant of Christ Jesus” (Colossians 1:7; 4:12).

His name and Paul’s comment in Colossians 4:11 indicates that Epaphras was a Gentile. We also surmise that he was from Colossae in Asia Minor, since his name appears in the letter to the church there and Paul says that he “is one of you” (Colossians 4:12). According to Paul, writing during his first Roman imprisonment, Epaphras was the one who shared the gospel with the Colossians and possibly started the church there: Paul speaks of “the day you heard [the gospel]” and reminds them that “you learned it from Epaphras” (Colossians 1:6–7). Epaphras traveled to Rome to visit Paul, informing Paul about the Colossians’ “love in the Spirit” (Colossians 1:8).

In his letter, Paul told the Colossians about how Epaphras cared deeply for their spiritual growth and maturity. Epaphras had committed to praying for the Colossians, “always wrestling in prayer for [them]” (Colossians 4:12). Epaphras desired for the Colossian Christians to stand firm in their faith and become mature. Paul gave testimony that Epaphras was working hard for the church in Colossae, just as he was for the believers in Laodicea and Hierapolis (Colossians 4:13).

Aside from the letter to the Colossians, Epaphras’s name shows up in Paul’s personal letter to Philemon. Like Colossians, Paul wrote Philemon during his first imprisonment in Rome. Epaphras had apparently been imprisoned while in Rome visiting Paul: “Epaphras, my fellow prisoner in Christ Jesus, sends you greetings” (Philemon 1:23). Tradition teaches that Epaphras eventually returned to Colossae where he remained a faithful servant of Christ and was later martyred. But those details are not found in the Bible.

The descriptions of Epaphras are significant: “our dear fellow servant,” “a faithful minister of Christ,” “a servant of Christ Jesus,” “always wrestling in prayer,” and “working hard.” The brief sketch Paul provides shows that the apostle thought highly of this follower of Christ and fellow laborer. Epaphras demonstrated a strong faith, a rich prayer life, a boldness in sharing the gospel even at the risk of suffering, and deep care for those in whom he had invested spiritually. Epaphras is probably not the first name that comes to mind when we think of Bible characters, but he faithfully served Jesus, and his reward is sure (see Hebrews 6:10).

Analysis
Douglas Moo, in his commentary about Colossians, writes this about Epaphras: "Little is known about him, though we can infer that he was a native of Colossae and that he was perhaps converted by Paul himself during the apostle's ministry in Ephesus. The mention of a co-worker at this point in a Pauline epistle is unusual, and the strength of Paul's endorsement of him is also striking (note also 4:12-13)."

References

People in the Pauline epistles
Epistle to the Colossians
Epistle to Philemon
People from Colossae